The 2017 Pepsi Tankard, the provincial men's curling championship of New Brunswick was held February 8 to 12 in Saint John, New Brunswick.  The winning Mike Kennedy rink represented New Brunswick at the 2017 Tim Hortons Brier in St. John's, Newfoundland and Labrador.

Teams
The teams are listed as follows:

Round-robin standings

Scores
Draw 1
Roach 6-5 Barry
Kennedy 9-4 Cain
Grattan 6-5 Mallais
Odishaw 10-4 Sullivan

Draw 2
Kennedy 8-5 Sullivan
Mallais 8-3 Barry
Odishaw 8-5 Cain
Grattan 6-5 Roach

Draw 3
Mallais 8-3 Cain
Grattan 7-0 Odishaw
Sullivan 8-6 Roach
Barry 6-5 Kennedy

Draw 4
Kennedy 6-4 Odishaw
Sullivan 7-5 Cain
Grattan 8-5 Barry
Roach 7-5 Mallais

Draw 5
Roach 8-4 Cain
Kennedy 8-5 Grattan
Sullivan 8-4 Mallais
Odishaw 10-7 Barry

Draw 6
Mallais 6-1 Odishaw
Barry 8-6 Sullivan
Kennedy 8-4 Roach
Cain 7-6 Grattan

Draw 7
Sullivan 9-6 Grattan
Roach 10-6 Odishaw
Barry 7-4 Cain
Kennedy 6-3 Mallais

Tiebreaker
Grattan 8-1 Roach

Playoffs

Semifinal
Saturday, February 11, 7:00 pm

Final
Sunday, February 12, 5:00 pm

References

External links 
Official website

2017 Tim Hortons Brier
Curling competitions in Saint John, New Brunswick
2017 in New Brunswick
February 2017 sports events in Canada